Procambridgea is a genus of South Pacific sheetweb spiders that was first described by Raymond Robert Forster & C. L. Wilton in 1973.

Species
 it contains twelve species, found in New Zealand and Australia:
Procambridgea carrai Davies, 2001 – Australia (New South Wales)
Procambridgea cavernicola Forster & Wilton, 1973 – Australia (New South Wales)
Procambridgea grayi Davies, 2001 – Australia (New South Wales), New Zealand
Procambridgea hilleri Davies, 2001 – Australia (Queensland)
Procambridgea hunti Davies, 2001 – Australia (New South Wales)
Procambridgea kioloa Davies, 2001 – Australia (New South Wales)
Procambridgea lamington Davies, 2001 – Australia (Queensland)
Procambridgea montana Davies, 2001 – Australia (Queensland, New South Wales)
Procambridgea monteithi Davies, 2001 – Australia (New South Wales)
Procambridgea otwayensis Davies, 2001 – Australia (Victoria)
Procambridgea ourimbah Davies, 2001 – Australia (New South Wales)
Procambridgea rainbowi Forster & Wilton, 1973 (type) – Australia (New South Wales)

See also
 List of Stiphidiidae species

References

Araneomorphae genera
Spiders of Australia
Stiphidiidae
Taxa named by Raymond Robert Forster